The Pohangina River is a river of the southwestern North Island of New Zealand.

Brown and (rarely) rainbow trout live in the river but are rare above the Centre Creek confluence. The headwaters of the river above the Cattle Creek confluence are home to small numbers of whio (blue duck; Hymenolaimus malacorhynchus).

Tourist spots

Totara Reserve Regional Park 
In the area is the Totara Reserve Regional Park. It covers 340 ha of bush and many other tourist attractions. It also includes a safe spot for swimming.

References 

Rivers of Manawatū-Whanganui
Rivers of New Zealand